Manoranjan Shill Gopal (born 1 January 1964), also known as Gopal, is a Bangladeshi politician who has served as Member of Parliament for Dinajpur-1 since 2005.

Career 
Gopal unsuccessfully contested Jatiyo Sangshad (National Parliament) constituency Dinajpur-1 in 1991 under the National Democratic Party banner, in June 1996 as the Jatiya Party candidate, and in 2001 as the Islami Oikya Jote candidate.

He ran as an independent in the December 2005 by-election for Dinajpur-1, and was elected Member of Parliament with a majority of 62,401 votes. Representing the Bangladesh Awami League, he was re-elected to the seat in the 2008 and 2014 general elections.

In September 2017, Gopal was sued by an Awami League activists for renaming Sheikh Mujibur Rahman College to MS Gopal Model College.

In September 2018, Awami League activists declared Gopal unwanted in Dinajpur District in a rally. He was re-elected from Dinajpur-1 as an Awami League candidate in December 2018.

References 

Kodaikanal International School alumni
1964 births
Awami League politicians
9th Jatiya Sangsad members
Living people
10th Jatiya Sangsad members
11th Jatiya Sangsad members
5th Jatiya Sangsad members
7th Jatiya Sangsad members
8th Jatiya Sangsad members
People from Dinajpur District, Bangladesh
Bangladeshi Hindus